In baseball, a left fielder, abbreviated LF, is an outfielder who plays defense in left field. Left field is the area of the outfield to the left of a person standing at home plate and facing towards the pitcher's mound. In the numbering system used to record defensive plays, the left fielder is assigned the number 7.

Position description

Left fielders must cover large distances - speed, instincts, and quickness in reacting to the ball are key. They must be able to catch fly balls above their heads and on the run. They must be able to throw the ball accurately over a long distance to be effective; they must also learn to judge whether to attempt a difficult catch and risk letting the ball get past them, or to instead allow the ball to fall in order to guarantee a swift play and prevent the advance of runners. Left fielders must also familiarize themselves with the varying configurations of different ballparks' foul territory, and prevent balls hit down the foul lines from getting past them into the left field corner. Amateur players may find it difficult to concentrate on the game, since they are so far from the action. Emphasizing the correct position will give outfield players something to concentrate on at each pitch. Hits to left field tend to curve toward the left field foul line, and left fielders must learn to adjust to that.

Of all outfielders, the left fielder often will have the weakest arm, as he generally does not need to throw the ball as far to prevent the advance of any baserunners. The left fielder still requires good fielding and catching skills, and tends to receive more balls than the right fielder because right-handed hitters tend to "pull" the ball into left field.  The left fielder also backs up third base on pick-off attempts from the catcher or pitcher and bunts, when possible. Moreover, when a runner is stealing third base, the left fielder must back up the throw from the catcher. Left fielders must also back up third base when a ball is thrown from right field, and back up center field when a pop fly is hit into the pocket.

Despite giving his team the advantage of accommodating a player with a weak arm, a left fielder with an above-average throwing arm can easily compile many assists. After being converted to left field, Alfonso Soriano led the league with 22 and 19 outfield assists in 2006 and 2007, respectively, his first two years playing the outfield. Despite regularly leading the league in errors and often coming out of the game for a defensive replacement in late innings, his strong arm was best utilized in left.

Hall of Fame left fielders
The following are baseball players inducted to the National Baseball Hall of Fame as left fielders:

 Lou Brock
 Jesse Burkett
 Fred Clarke
 Ed Delahanty
 Goose Goslin
 Chick Hafey

 Rickey Henderson
 Monte Irvin
 Joe Kelley
 Ralph Kiner
 Heinie Manush
 Joe Medwick

 Stan Musial
 Jim O'Rourke
 Tim Raines
 Jim Rice
 Al Simmons

 Willie Stargell
 Zack Wheat
 Billy Williams
 Ted Williams
 Carl Yastrzemski

Position transitions
When most left fielders are older or struggling defensively, they will move to first base (Stan Musial, Albert Pujols and Willie Stargell are the most prominent left fielders to switch to first base later in their career) or designated hitter, usually. Third basemen will sometimes move to left, with Ryan Braun, Kris Bryant and Alex Gordon being examples.

References

See also

 Baseball Hall of Fame
 Gold Glove Award

Baseball positions
Softball